Benjamin de Rohan, duc de Soubise (1580–1642), was a French Huguenot leader.

Son of René II, Viscount of Rohan, and younger brother of Henri de Rohan, he inherited the lordship of Soubise through his mother Catherine de Parthenay.  He served his apprenticeship as a soldier under Maurice of Nassau in the Low Countries. In the religious wars from 1621 onwards his elder brother chiefly commanded on land and in the south, Soubise in the west and along the sea-coast. His exploits in the conflict have been sympathetically related by his brother, one of the most highly regarded military critics of the time.

Soubise's chief exploit was a singularly bold and well-conducted attack (in 1625) on the Royalist fleet in the river Blavet (which included the cutting of a boom in the face of superior numbers) and the occupation of the islands of Ré and Oléron in 1625, leading to the Siege of Saint-Martin-de-Ré (1625) in which Louis XIII recovered the island of Ré. He commanded at La Rochelle during the famous Siege of La Rochelle (1627–1628). According to his brother, the failure of the defence and of the English attack on Île de Ré was mainly due to the alternate obstinacy of the townsfolk and the English commanders in refusing to listen to Soubise's advice.

When surrender became inevitable he fled to England, which he had previously visited in quest of succour. He died in 1642 in London.

No such title as "Duke of Soubise" ever existed in France. The title, prince de Soubise was later borne by a cadet branch of the House of Rohan, which inherited the secundogeniture of Soubise from a Rohan-Chabot heiress, a descendant in the female line of Henri, 1st Duke of Rohan. The princes de Soubise did not descend from Benjamin, who never bore that title. Nor did he ever receive the dukedom of Frontenay, although that title, too, is sometimes mistakenly attributed to him.

See also
 French wars of religion

References

1580s births
1642 deaths
French military leaders
French Protestants
Huguenots
Benjamin de Rohan